Tusculum is a city in Greene County, Tennessee, United States. The population was 3,298 at the 2020 census. It is the site of Tusculum University, the oldest university in Tennessee and the 28th oldest in the United States. Tusculum is a suburb of nearby Greeneville. The population of both Greeneville and Tusculum combined was approximately 18,777 at the 2020 census.

Geography
Tusculum is located at  (36.175697, -82.750728).

Neighborhoods
 Afton
 Tusculum Place
 Twin Oaks

Demographics

2020 census

As of the 2020 United States census, there were 3,298 people, 641 households, and 461 families residing in the city.

2000 census
At the 2000 census, there were 2,004 people, 590 households and 437 families residing in the city. The racial makeup of the city was 95.41% White, 3.64% African American, 0.05% Native American, 0.50% Asian, 0.05% from other races, and 0.35% from two or more races. Hispanic or Latino of any race were 0.30% of the population.

There were 590 households, of which 24.4% had children under the age of 18 living with them, 64.4% were married couples living together, 7.3% had a female householder with no husband present, and 25.8% were non-families. 23.1% of all households were made up of individuals, and 9.2% had someone living alone who was 65 years of age or older. The average household size was 2.28 and the average family size was 2.66.

12.7% of the population were under the age of 18, 18.3% from 18 to 24, 25.4% from 25 to 44, 28.8% from 45 to 64, and 14.9% who were 65 years of age or older. The median age was 41 years. For every 100 females, there were 106.2 males. For every 100 females age 18 and over, there were 104.2 males.

The median household income was $37,460 and the median family income was $50,074. Males had a median income of $31,607 and females $23,594. The per capita income was $15,834. About 5.8% of families and 6.1% of the population were below the poverty line, including 3.4% of those under age 18 and 9.0% of those age 65 or over.

Education
Tusculum is the site of the main campus of Tusculum University.

Greene County Public Schools operates one elementary school in Tusculum, Doak Elementary School, serving grades Pk-5. Chuckey-Doak Middle School and Chuckey-Doak High School are also located in Tusculum city limits but both have an Afton address. They are also operated by Greene County Public Schools.

Postal service
Tusculum has a branch post office located on the college campus. The main zip code for Tusculum is 37745, although some portions of the city are in Afton's zip code, 37616.

Tusculum shares the zip code 37745 with Baileyton and Greeneville.

Recreation
The City of Tusculum operates and manages Tusculum City Park and Tusculum Linear Park Trail (Greenway)

Transportation
State Route 107 formerly went through downtown Tusculum, it has since been rerouted along U.S. Route 11E and US Route 321 on the north side of the city and on a new alignment of SR-107 on the east side of the city, titled Tusculum Bypass. US-11E and US-321 run concurrently on the north side of the city. SR-351 also junctions with SR-107 on the southeast side of the city. The main road through downtown is Erwin Highway (the former SR-107).

References

 
Cities in Tennessee
Cities in Greene County, Tennessee
1959 establishments in Tennessee
Tusculum University